Ruslan Savelyevich Karaev (Karayev) (born May 19, 1983) is a Russian kickboxer. He is K-1 World GP 2005 in Las Vegas and K-1 World Grand Prix 2008 in Taipei tournament champion.
He joined the Golden Glory's K-1 stable, training under Cor Hemmers.

Biography and career

On August 13, 2005 Ruslan Karaev made his K-1 tournament debut at K-1 World GP 2005 in Las Vegas as a virtual unknown. In quarter finals Karaev faced Freddy Kemayo of France and won the bout by 1 round spinning back kick KO that caught Kemayo in the midsection. In the semifinals, Karaev faced muay thai stylist Azem Maksutaj, what was later acknowledged as one of the greatest battles of K-1 history. He topped his performance of the night by a unanimous decision win over American Scott Lighty and was crowned the tournament champion.

On September 23, 2005 at the K-1 World GP Final Eliminations in Osaka Dome, Japan he faced Rickard Nordstrand from Sweden the replacement fighter of four time World Champion Ernesto Hoost who had to pull out due to a leg injury. Ruslan won the fight by unanimous decision and earned his first appearance at the K-1 World Grand Prix 2005 Finals.

Ruslan finished up his rookie year in K-1 on November 19, 2005 at the Tokyo Dome, his quarterfinal opponent was Musashi. Ruslan lost the fight by an extra round  decision.

Karaev made it to the K-1 World GP 2006 Final after a Knocking Out win over Badr Hari Where he was knocked out in the first round by Glaube Feitosa.

In 2007 Karaev suffered two more consecutive knockout losses to Badr Hari and Melvin Manhoef.

Ruslan missed his announced fight against Jerome Le Banner on September 29, 2007 at K-1 World GP 2007 Final Elimination in Seoul, Korea, due to a traffic accident suffered several days before the match.

After caring for his sick mother Ruslan came back to K-1 in July 2008 in the K-1 World GP 2008 in Taipei tournament. Karaev knocked out all three of his opponents to secure a spot at the K-1 World GP 2008 Final 16. He fought and knocked out Chalid Arrab in the second round to be given a spot in the quarterfinals of the K-1 World GP 2008 Final, against Gokhan Saki. Ruslan again was not able to get past the quarterfinals after losing a decision.

At the K-1 World Grand Prix 2009 Final 16 Karaev beat the new and current heavyweight champion, Keijiro Maeda by unanimous decision.

In his fourth appearance at the K-1 World Grand Prix Finals he was knocked out in the first round in a 3rd match against Badr Hari.

Ruslan Karaev was scheduled to fight Le Banner in April 2010, Yokohama, but that fight got cancelled because of an injured knee. Karaev got replaced by Tyrone Spong.

After a three-year hiatus due to a knee injury and falling out with Golden Glory, Karaev announced his comeback in October 2013, signing with the Moldovan-based King of Kings promotion.

Titles

Professional
 2008 K-1 World Grand Prix in Taipei champion
 2005 K-1 World Grand Prix in Las Vegas II champion

Amateur
2003 W.A.K.O. World Championships  -91 kg (Full-Contact)
2003 Amateur Kickboxing European champion 
2002 Amateur Kickboxing European tournament finalist

Kickboxing record

|-  bgcolor="#FFBBBB"
| 2009-12-05 || Loss ||align=left| Badr Hari || K-1 World Grand Prix 2009 Final || Yokohama, Japan || KO (Right Hook) || 1 || 0:38 ||
|-  bgcolor="#FFBBBB"
| 2009-10-17 || Loss ||align=left| Hesdy Gerges || Ultimate Glory 11: A Decade of Fights || Amsterdam, Netherlands || Decision (Unanimous) || 3 || 3:00 || 
|-
! style=background:white colspan=9 |
|-
|-  bgcolor="#CCFFCC"
| 2009-09-26 || Win ||align=left| Kyotaro || K-1 World Grand Prix 2009 Final 16 || Seoul, Republic of Korea || Decision (Unanimous) || 3 || 3:00 || 
|-  bgcolor="#FFBBBB"
| 2008-12-06 || Loss ||align=left| Gokhan Saki || K-1 World GP 2008 Final || Yokohama, Japan || Decision (Unanimous) || 3 || 3:00 || 
|-  bgcolor="#CCFFCC"
| 2008-09-27 || Win ||align=left| Chalid Arrab || K-1 World GP 2008 Final 16 || Seoul, Korea || TKO (Referee Stoppage) || 2 || 2:30 || 
|-  bgcolor="#CCFFCC"
| 2008-07-13 || Win ||align=left| Aleksandr Pitchkounov || K-1 World GP 2008 in Taipei || Taipei City, Taiwan || KO (Left hook) || 1 || 2:03 || 
|-
! style=background:white colspan=9 |
|-
|-  bgcolor="#CCFFCC"
| 2008-07-13 || Win ||align=left| Young-Hyun Kim || K-1 World GP 2008 in Taipei || Taipei City, Taiwan || TKO (Doctor stoppage) || 1 || 0:15 || 
|-  bgcolor="#CCFFCC"
| 2008-07-13 || Win ||align=left| Tatsufumi Tomihira || K-1 World GP 2008 in Taipei || Taipei City, Taiwan || KO (Left hook) || 3 || 2:20 || 
|-  bgcolor="#CCFFCC"
| 2008-03-09 || Win ||align=left| Hiromi Amada || Magnum16, All Japan Kickboxing || Tokyo, Japan || KO (Punches) || 3 || 2:06 || 
|-  bgcolor="#FFBBBB"
| 2007-06-23 || Loss ||align=left| Melvin Manhoef || K-1 World GP 2007 in Amsterdam || Amsterdam, Netherlands || KO (Left hook) || 1 || 0:31 || 
|-  bgcolor="#FFBBBB"
| 2007-03-04 || Loss ||align=left| Badr Hari || K-1 World GP 2007 in Yokohama || Yokohama, Japan || KO (Right Cross) || 2 || 2:46 || 
|-  bgcolor="#FFBBBB"
| 2006-12-02 || Loss ||align=left| Glaube Feitosa || K-1 World GP 2006 Final || Tokyo, Japan || KO (High kick) || 1 || 1:11 || 
|-  bgcolor="#CCFFCC"
| 2006-09-30 || Win ||align=left| Badr Hari || K-1 World Grand Prix 2006 in Osaka Opening Round || Osaka, Japan || KO (Right punch) || 1 || 0:52 || 
|-  bgcolor="#CCFFCC"
| 2006-08-12 || Win ||align=left| Dewey Cooper || K-1 World Grand Prix 2006 in Las Vegas II || Las Vegas, NV || Decision (Unanimous) || 3 || 3:00 || 
|-  bgcolor="#FFBBBB"
| 2006-06-03 || Loss ||align=left| Ray Sefo || K-1 World Grand Prix 2006 in Seoul || Seoul, Korea || KO (Right hook) || 1 || 1:42 || 
|-  bgcolor="#CCFFCC"
| 2006-04-29 || Win ||align=left| Stefan Leko || K-1 World GP 2006 in Las Vegas || Las Vegas, NV || Decision (Unanimous) || 3 || 3:00 || 
|-  bgcolor="#FFBBBB"
| 2005-11-19 || Loss ||align=left| Musashi || K-1 World Grand Prix 2005 || Tokyo, Japan || Ext. R Decision (Unanimous) || 4 || 3:00 || 
|-  bgcolor="#CCFFCC"
| 2005-09-23 || Win ||align=left| Rickard Nordstrand || K-1 World Grand Prix 2005 in Osaka - Final Elimination || Osaka, Japan || Decision (Unanimous) || 3 || 3:00 || 
|-  bgcolor="#CCFFCC"
| 2005-08-13 || Win ||align=left| Scott Lighty || K-1 World Grand Prix 2005 in Las Vegas II || Las Vegas, NV || Decision (Unanimous) || 3 || 3:00 || 
|-
! style=background:white colspan=9 |
|-
|-  bgcolor="#CCFFCC"
| 2005-08-13 || Win ||align=left| Azem Maksutaj || K-1 World Grand Prix 2005 in Las Vegas II || Las Vegas, NV || Decision (Unanimous) || 3 || 3:00 || 
|-  bgcolor="#CCFFCC"
| 2005-08-13 || Win ||align=left| Freddy Kemayo || K-1 World Grand Prix 2005 in Las Vegas II || Las Vegas, NV || KO (Spinning back Mid-kick) || 1 || 1:39 || 
|-  bgcolor="#FFBBBB"
| 2005-06-17 || Loss ||align=left| Ray Sefo || K-1 World Grand Prix 2005 in Hiroshima || Hiroshima, Japan || TKO (Referee Stoppage)  || 1 || 0:37 || 
|-  bgcolor="#CCFFCC"
| 2003  || Win ||align=left| Gabor Meiszter || W.A.K.O. World Championships 2003 || Paris, France || KO || 2 ||  || 
|-  bgcolor="#CCFFCC"
| 2003  || Win ||align=left| Corneliu Rus || W.A.K.O. World Championships 2003 || Paris, France ||  ||  ||  || 
|-
| colspan=9 | Legend:

See also
List of K-1 Events
List of K-1 champions
List of male kickboxers

References

External links
Profile at K-1

1983 births
Living people
Russian male kickboxers
Heavyweight kickboxers
Ossetian people
Russian expatriates in Japan
Sportspeople from Vladikavkaz
Russian people of Ossetian descent